Philippe Honoré may refer to:
 Philippe Honoré (cartoonist) (1941–2015), French cartoonist
 Philippe Honoré (violinist) (born 1967), French violinist

See also
 Philippe-Honoré Roy (1847–1910), lawyer and political figure in Quebec